968 was a year.

968 may also refer to:
The car, Porsche 968
The car, Zaporozhets, also known as 968
The international calling code for Oman

See also
List of highways numbered 968